The following lists events occurring in 2009 in Saudi Arabia.

Incumbents
Monarch: Abdullah
Crown Prince: Sultan

Events 

 The first female minister, Norah Al Faiz, was appointed to the Saudi Arabian government.
 In September 2009, King Abdullah University of Science and Technology opened its first coeducational campus.
 Flooding in Jeddah killed over 120 people with another 350 injured.

References 

 
2000s in Saudi Arabia
Saudi Arabia
Saudi Arabia
Years of the 21st century in Saudi Arabia